Mateusz Kwiatkowski (born 23 November 1992) is a Polish professional footballer who plays as a forward for Świt Nowy Dwór Mazowiecki.

References

External links
 

Living people
1992 births
Polish footballers
Association football forwards
Ruch Chorzów players
Legionovia Legionowo players
Stilon Gorzów Wielkopolski players
Błękitni Stargard players
Świt Nowy Dwór Mazowiecki players
Ekstraklasa players
II liga players
III liga players
People from Szczecinek
Sportspeople from West Pomeranian Voivodeship